Cope (stylized as COPE™) is the second album by English DJ and record producer Adam Freeland, credited only by his surname. It was released on 8 June 2009 by Marine Parade Records. Freeland worked with Alex Metric and collaborated with artists, such as Kurt Baumann, Brody Dalle, Gerald Casale, John Ceparano and Kim Field, who contributed vocals to songs on the album.

Track listing

References

External links 
 [ COPE™] at AllMusic
 

2009 albums